The Victoria Railway was a  long Canadian railway that operated in Central Ontario. The line is best known as having been built by a large group of Icelandic immigrants, who found the Kinmount winters too rough, and so they all moved to Gimli, Manitoba. The line became part of the Midland Railway of Canada and then later part of the Canadian National Railways. The line was abandoned completely by the early 1990s.

History
The Victoria Railway was originally planned as the Lindsay, Fenelon Falls, and Ottawa River Railway, 
which was chartered in 1872. The line ran north from Lindsay through the former Victoria County and continued onwards to join a then prospected line of the Canadian Pacific Railway near the town of Mattawa. Soon after the gauge was changed from a narrow to standard gauge, and the railway was renamed "The Victoria Railway." The railway initially met significant opposition from the town of Peterborough while Lindsay and the unincorporated village of Fenelon Falls, supported the project enthusiastically. Municipal blockades against the railway were removed in 1874 by making Fenelon Falls an incorporated village and creating the Provisional County of Haliburton out of the northern townships of Peterborough and Victoria counties. With funds allocated the railway construction in Lindsay on August 5th, 1874 by the decree of the Honourable Christopher Finlay Fraser, then Ontario Commissioner of Public Works. 

Construction began with the segment between Lindsay and Kinmount, where derooting large pine stumps posed significant difficulty to the labourers. In addition to this, multiple bridges needed to be constructed between the two towns. This included a 200-foot bridge over Distillery Creek, a 500-foot bridge and 3000 foot fill at McLaren's Creek, a $20,000 bridge over the Fenelon River, and a 133-foot bridge over the Burnt River. Work on the railway was interrupted twice by financial depression in 1875. The railway was largely constructed by an immigrant community of 300 Icelandic men, women, and children who settled Kinmount in 1874. However, alongside the financial depression in 1875, dysentery demoralised construction efforts. This led to the Icelandic immigrants all moving to Manitoba in September 1875. Construction picked up once again however with the arrival of steel, despite financial restraints on the project. The railway received more funding when president of the project, George Laidlaw, secured a grant of $8,000 per mile from the Ontario provincial government and a bonus $3,000 per mile from the Canada Land and Emigration Company, which owned much of Haliburton County. The largest obstacle to the project came when a large rock cutting and a sinkhole four miles north of Kinmount interfered with the final 22 miles of the railway. The 56 miles of rail from Lindsay to Haliburton village finally opened to traffic on November 26th, 1878.

Timeline

 1871: Formation of the Fenelon Falls Railway Company
 1872: Renamed as the Lindsay, Fenelon Falls and Ottawa River Railway Company
 1873: Renamed as the Victoria Railway Company
 1880: Acquisition by the Midland Railway of Canada
 1882: Consolidation of the Victoria Railway Company, the Midland Railway of Canada, the Toronto and Nipissing Railway, the Whitby, Port Perry and Lindsay Railway, the Toronto and Ottawa Railway and the Grand Junction Railway.

Principal stations
Lindsay, Ontario
Cameron, Ontario
Fenelon Falls, Ontario
Fell(s), Ontario
Burnt River, Ontario
Watsons, Ontario
Kinmount, Ontario
Gelert, Ontario
Lochlin, Ontario
Donald, Ontario
Haliburton, Ontario

Howland Junction
Howland Junction was the junction of the Victoria Railway with the Irondale, Bancroft and Ottawa Railway (IB&O). It was the southern terminus of the IB&O. The site was originally a flag stop on the Victoria Railway known as Kendrick's, and took its name from nearby Kendrick's Creek. When William Myles built his horse-drawn wagonway, the Myles Branch Tramway, this interchange point with the Victoria Railway became known as Myles Junction.

The place was renamed to Kinmount Junction following the collapse of Myles' business operations in the area, then once again renamed Howland Junction.

Closure
The line became part of Canadian National Railways in 1923 with its acquisition of the former Grand Trunk Railway of Canada.  Mixed freight/passenger train service ran until September, 1960.  CN applied for abandonment in 1978. The Canadian Transport Commission approved the line's abandonment in 1981, and most of the line being taken up in 1983; a final short section south of Kent St Lindsay was taken up in October 1992. The entire length of the line is now the Haliburton County Rail Trail and the Victoria Rail Trail public recreational trails.

References

Midland Railway of Canada
Defunct Ontario railways
Predecessors of the Grand Trunk Railway
Railway companies established in 1874
1874 establishments in Ontario
Standard gauge railways in Canada
History of transport in Haliburton County
History of rail transport in Kawartha Lakes